William Tai (2 January 1948 – 11 December 2020), known professionally as Malik, was a Belgian comic book artist.

Publications

Series

Archie Cash
Le Maître de l'épouvante (1973)
Le Carnaval des zombies (1974)
Le Déserteur de Toro-Toro (1975)
Un train d'enfer (1976)
Cibles pour Long Thi (1977)
Où règnent les rats (1978)
Le Démon aux cheveux d'ange (1978)
Asphalte (1982)
Le Cagoulard aux yeux rouges (1983)
Le Chevalier de la mort verte (1984)
The Popcorn Brothers (1985)
Les Petits Bouddhas qui chantent faux (1986)
Les Rastas et le bouffon bleu (1987)
Chasse-cœur à Koa-Gule (1987)
Curare (1988)
Qui a tué Jack London ? (2019)

Blue Bird
Un duel dans une guitare (1984)
Twiggy dans la souricière (1984)

Chansons cochonnes
Chansons cochonnes (1990)
Chansons cochonnes 2 (1991)
Chansons cochonnes 3 (1992)
Chansons paillardes (2014)

Chiwana
De la poussière et des larmes (1984)
Barils, Barbouzes & Barillets (1985)

Les Colonnes du ciel
La Saison des loups (1989)
La Lumière du lac (1992)

Cupidon
Premières flèches (1990)
Philtre d'amour (1991)
Baiser de feu (1991)
Souffle au cœur (1992)
Arc en ciel (1993)
L'Ange et l'Eau (1994)
Un amour de gorille (1995)
Je l'aime un peu… (1996)
Vive la mariée (1997)
Coup de foudre (1998)
Lune de miel (1999)
Le Cœur dans les nuages (2000)
Jour de chance (2001)
Toutes les amours du monde (2002)
Plus jamais seul (2003)
Cadeau du ciel (2004)
Amour en cage (2005)
Rien que pour vous ! (2006)
Solitude (2007)
Elles et Moi (2008)
Le Nœud du problème (2009)
Une copine pour Cupidon (2012)
Fous d'ailes (2013)

Johnny Paraguay
La Captive du Baron Samedi (1983)
Stalnaker (1985)

Sortilège
Sortilège I (2011)
Sortilège II (2013)
Sortilège III (2018)

One-Shots
Rire c'est rire (1995)
Gertrude au pays des belges (1996)
Un amour de province… le Brabant wallon (2005)
En chemin elle rencontre… Les artistes se mobilisent contre la violence faite aux femmes (2009)
Avec Vauban (2010)
Alianah - Un conte de Guy d'Artet (2015)

References

Belgian comics artists
1948 births
2020 deaths